A  or  was an unmarried female member of the Japanese Imperial Family, sent to Ise to serve at Ise Grand Shrine from the late 7th century until the 14th century. The remains of Saikū are situated in the town of Meiwa, Mie Prefecture, Japan.

Origins 

According to Japanese legend, around 2,000 years ago the divine Yamatohime-no-mikoto, daughter of the Emperor Suinin, set out from Mount Miwa in Nara Prefecture in search of a permanent location to worship the goddess Amaterasu-ōmikami. Her search lasted for 20 years and eventually brought her to Ise, Mie Prefecture, where the Ise Shrine now stands. Prior to Yamatohime-no-mikoto's journey, Amaterasu-ōmikami had been worshiped at the Imperial Palaces in Yamato.

In the 13th century, Jien recorded in the  that during the reign of Emperor Suinin, the first High Priestess was appointed for Ise Shrine.  Hayashi Gahō's 17th-century  is somewhat more expansive, explaining that since Suinin's time, a daughter of the emperor was almost always appointed as high priestess, but across the centuries, there had been times when the emperor himself had no daughter; and in such circumstances, the daughter of a close relative of the emperor would have been appointed to fill the untimely vacancy.

Role 

Three rituals a year were conducted at the Shrine in which the  prayed for peace and protection. In June and November each year, she journeyed to the Shrine to perform the Tsukinamisai Festival.

Life at Saikū was, for the most part, peaceful. The  would spend her time composing  verses, collect shells on the shore of Ōyodo beach, or set out in boats and recite poetry upon the water and wait to be recalled to Kyoto.

Selection process 
When an Emperor died or abdicated the throne, when the 's relative died, or when certain political power required, she would be recalled to the capital and a new  selected from one of the new Emperor's unmarried female relatives using divination by either burnt tortoise shell or deer bones. The new  would then undergo a period of purification before setting out with her retinue of up to 500 people for Saikū, never to return to the capital until recalled by the next Emperor.

Upon the selection of the new , the current  and her retinue would return to the capital to resume their lives as part of the Imperial Court. It was considered a great honor to marry a former  and her time at Saikū improved her own position at court and those of the people who served with her.

Procession to Saikū 

The procession routes of the  changed after the capital was moved to Heian-kyō in 794.

The procession began in what is today the Arashiyama district on the west side of Kyoto. In the Heian period, successive imperial princesses stayed in the Nonomiya Shrine for a year or more to purify themselves before becoming representatives of the imperial family at the Ise Shrine. Contemporary annual processions recreate a scene from a picture scroll of the imperial court during the Heian period, starting from the shrine and continuing as far as the Togetsu-kyo Bridge, Arashiyama.

Up to 500 people would set out from Kyoto as a part of the 's retinue for the journey, which lasted six days and five nights. From Kyoto, they travelled in an eastward direction, passing through the Suzuka Pass, which was without doubt the most difficult part of the journey. Here, the  would stop to perform a final cleansing ritual before crossing the river and travelling the short distance to Saikū.

The  was expected to remain at Saikū until the emperor whom she represented either died or abdicated the throne. The  was permitted to return to Kyoto only on the provision of a close relative's death. When returning to Kyoto, a different route was taken through the mountains to Nara, then to Osaka Bay where a ceremony was to be performed before she could finally return to the capital.

From Japanese literature

Princess Ōku
The  (The Anthology of Ten Thousand Leaves), tells the story of Princess Ōku, the first  to serve at Ise Shrine. The daughter of Emperor Tenmu, Japan's 40th emperor (according to the traditional order of succession), Princess Ōku and her younger brother, Prince Ōtsu, survived the Jinshin incident. Here she enshrined her brother's remains on Mt. Futakami before she died the age of 41.

Princess Yoshiko
After returning to the capital, she became a consort to Emperor Murakami and gave birth to Princess Noriko. She became famous throughout Kyoto for her colorful life, devoting herself to waka poetry and music. According to the story, she falls in love with Prince Genji, but her jealous nature brings about the death of two of her rivals.

Princess Yasuko
Ariwara-no-Narihira, well known in his time for his good looks, is married to Princess Yasuko's cousin, but on meeting at the Saikū, they fall into forbidden love. Giving in to temptation, they secretly meet under a pine tree on the shore of Ōyodo Port to reveal their feelings for one another and to promise to meet again the following night. But this first secret meeting would also be the last, as Narihira was due to depart that next day for Owari Province. Princess Yasuko came to see Narihira off, and they were never to see each other again, though it is said that Princess Yasuko bore a child as a result of the brief love affair.

End of the  system
It is not precisely clear when the  system ended, but what is known is that it occurred during the turmoil of the Nanboku-chō period when two rival Imperial courts were in existence, in Kyoto and Yoshino. The  system had been in steady decline up to this period, with Saikū reverting to just another rural rice farming village after the system's collapse.

Though the area of Saikū remained, it was unclear exactly where the old Imperial town stood until pottery remains were unearthed in 1970 during the construction of housing in the Saikū area, Meiwa Town. A modern museum was built on the site of the first finds and archaeological excavations are continuing, held each summer with the aid of volunteer school children from all over Japan. Though a site for the main  residence has been discovered, a large percentage of it lies beneath the main Kintetsu Ise railway line and is inaccessible.

Festivals

This festival is said to have started in the 6th century when the Emperor sent his representatives to Shimogamo and Kamigamo Shines to pray from good harvests.

The  is held in the town of Meiwa, Mie Prefecture, on the first weekend of June each year. More than 100 people dressed in traditional Heian-period dress along a section of the old Ise  (pilgrimage road), before ending in the grounds of the Saikū Museum.

List of 
After the establishment of the  system by Emperor Tenmu, these were priestesses of Ise Shrine.

Notes

References
 Brown, Delmer and Ichiro Ishida, eds. (1979). [ Jien, c.1220],  Gukanshō; "The Future and the Past: a translation and study of the 'Gukanshō,' an interpretive history of Japan written in 1219" translated from the Japanese and edited by Delmer M. Brown & Ichirō Ishida. Berkeley: University of California Press.  
 Farris, William Wayne. (1999). "Sacred Texts and Buried Treasures: Issues in the Historical Archaeology of Ancient Japan," Monumenta Nipponica, Vol. 54, No. 1, pp. 123–126.
 Titsingh, Isaac. (1834). [Siyun-sai Rin-siyo/Hayashi Gahō, 1652]. Nipon o daï itsi ran; ou,  Annales des empereurs du Japon.  Paris: Oriental Translation Society of Great Britain and Ireland.
 Varley, H. Paul, ed. (1980). [ Kitabatake Chikafusa, 1359], Jinnō Shōtōki ("A Chronicle of Gods and Sovereigns: Jinnō Shōtōki of Kitabatake Chikafusa" translated by H. Paul Varley). New York: Columbia University Press.

See also
 Saiin, the high priestess of the Kamo Shrine
 Kikoe-ōgimi, the high priestess of Ryukyu Kingdom

External links

Saikū Historical Museum (Japanese)
Itsukinomiya Historical Experience Hall (Japanese)
Saio Matsuri (Japanese)

Miko
Japanese monarchy
History of Mie Prefecture
Culture in Mie Prefecture
Saigū
History of Shinto